The term Times Higher Education–QS World University Rankings refers to rankings published jointly between 2004 and 2009 by Times Higher Education and Quacquarelli Symonds (QS). After QS and Times Higher Education had ended their collaboration, the methodology for these rankings continues to be used by its developer Quacquarelli Symonds. Since 2010 these rankings are known as the QS World University Rankings when Times Higher Education started publishing another ranking with methodology developed in partnership with Thomson Reuters in 2010, known as the Times Higher Education World University Rankings.

Criticism

The old iterations of the rankings produced collaboratively by THE and QS Quacquarelli Symonds received a number of criticisms. Some critics expressed concern about the manner in which the peer review conducted by THE-QS was carried out. In a report, Peter Wills from the University of Auckland, New Zealand wrote of the Times Higher Education-QS World University Rankings:

Ian Diamond, former chief executive of the Economic and Social Research Council and now vice-chancellor of the University of Aberdeen and a member of the editorial board, wrote to Times Higher Education in 2007, saying:

See also
 QS World University Rankings
 Times Higher Education World University Rankings
 THE–QS World University Rankings, 2004
 THE–QS World University Rankings, 2005
 THE–QS World University Rankings, 2006
 THE–QS World University Rankings, 2007
 THE–QS World University Rankings, 2008
 THE–QS World University Rankings, 2009

References

External links
Times Higher Education World University Rankings official website  
QS World University Rankings official website
Interactive maps comparing the Times Higher Education and QS World University Rankings

University and college rankings